Stefan Wolf (born 31 January 1971) is a retired Swiss football defender.

References

1971 births
Living people
Swiss men's footballers
Swiss Super League players
FC Luzern players
FC Sion players
Servette FC players
FC St. Gallen players
Switzerland international footballers
Association football defenders